"Then What" is a song by Australian rapper Illy and was released in May 2019 as the lead single from Illy's forthcoming sixth studio album, The Space Between (2021). "Then What" peaked at number 33 on the ARIA Charts and was certified platinum.

"Then What" was written about the changes since Illy's last album Two Degrees in 2016 and its success. Illy told Ben & Liam on Triple J "You notice people come around that weren't there before. When the times are good, they're there, and inevitably you sort of go quiet, start working on new stuff and they're not around anymore. It's not something to get bummed about, I find it funny because it's a cliché but it's true. I wanted to write a song addressing that."

At the APRA Music Awards of 2020, "Then What" was nominated for Most Performed Urban Work of the Year.

Reception
Zanda Wilson from The Music Network said "('Then What') is cut from the same cloth as some of his biggest radio hits, with Illy's clean and energetic combination of rapping and singing underpinned by production with pop sensibilities."

Charts

Weekly charts

Year-end charts

Certifications

References 

2019 singles
2019 songs
Illy (rapper) songs